Lecanora laxa is a species of lichen in the family Lecanoraceae.

See also
List of Lecanora species

References

laxa
Lichen species
Lichens described in 2000
Lichens of North America